Alexander Kaufmann (14 May 1817 – 1 May 1893) was a German poet and folklorist from Bonn.

Biography
Kaufmann came from a prominent local family, whose members had served in both the city government and service of the former Elector of Cologne. He was also related to the painters Andreas Müller and Karl Müller.

At the University of Bonn, he studied law, languages, and history. In 1844, Kaufmann was appointed to teach Prince Karl von Löwenstein-Wertheim-Rosenberg, who made him keeper of the Wertheim archives in 1850.  Kaufmann would retain this post until his death.

Works

Poetry collections
Gedichte (1852)
Mainsagen (1853)
Unter den Reben (1871)

Research and folklore
Research for Karl Simrock's Legends of the Rhine
Collected local legends of the Main 
Mythoterpe, ein Mythen-, Sagen- und Legendenbuch with poet Georg Friedrich Daumer; 
Researched information for Cæsarius von Heisterbach 
Translated Wunderbare Geschichten aus den Werken des Cæsarius von Heisterbach 
Biographie des belgischen Dominikaners Thomas von Chantimpre (posthumous)

References 

1817 births
1893 deaths
German folklorists
Writers from Bonn
People from the Rhine Province
University of Bonn alumni
German male poets
19th-century German poets
19th-century German male writers
German male non-fiction writers